Tanaellidae is a family of malacostracan crustacean.

Genera 
According to the World Register of Marine Species, the following genera are accepted within Tanaellidae:

 Araphura Bird & Holdich, 1984
 Arhaphuroides Sieg, 1986
 Arthrura Kudinova-Pasternak, 1966
 Inconnivus Błażewicz-Paszkowycz & Bamber, 2012
 Tanaella Norman & Stebbing, 1886

References 

Tanaidacea
Crustaceans described in 2002